HDDA may refer to:

 D-glycero-alpha-D-manno-heptose-7-phosphate kinase
 Hexadehydro Diels-Alder reaction